Mechanix Wear, Inc. is an American safety company headquartered in Valencia, California, that produces high performance work gloves in the automotive, industrial, tactical and construction segments.

Partnership 
On 14 July 2020, NASCAR and Mechanix Wear LLC, the pioneer in high-performance gloves, reported a multi-year agreement that will continue to recognize the company as an approved affiliate of NASCAR.

In September 2020, Mechanix Wear has partnered with DuPont Personal Protection.

Motorsports involvement

NASCAR
"The Original" Mechanix Wear gloves were first used in NASCAR during the 1991 Daytona 500 by the Richard Childress Racing Number 3 GM Goodwrench team. The company later became a team product supplier, contingency sponsor, NASCAR officials' product supplier, NASCAR aftermarket licensee and year-end Most Valuable Pit Crew award sponsor.

Most Valuable Pit Crew of the Year Award
In 2002, Mechanix Wear began sponsoring the "Mechanix Wear Most Valuable Pit Crew" award. The NASCAR year-end MVPC award is determined by a vote of all NASCAR Nextel Cup crew chiefs. Past winners include:

2002: #40 team – Chip Ganassi Racing
2003: #17 team – Roush Racing
2004: #48 team – Hendrick Motorsports
2005: #20 team – Joe Gibbs Racing
2006: #31 team – Richard Childress Racing
2007: #48 team - Hendrick Motorsports
2008: #48 team - Hendrick Motorsports
2009: #42 team - Earnhardt Ganassi Racing
2010: #11 team - Joe Gibbs Racing
2011: #99 team - Roush Fenway Racing
2012: #56 team - Michael Waltrip Racing
2013: #88 team - Hendrick Motorsports
2014: #4 team - Stewart-Haas Racing
2015: #41 team - Stewart-Haas Racing
2016: #48 team - Hendrick Motorsports

References
"Mechanix Wear, Inc business data." Manta.com. August 22, 2007 <http://www.manta.com/coms2/dnbcompany_ggzhvx>.

External links
Official website
Official Netherlands, Belgium and Luxemburg website 

Clothing companies of the United States
Clothing manufacturers
Manufacturing companies based in California
Companies based in Los Angeles County, California
Santa Clarita, California
Clothing companies established in 1984
1984 establishments in California